The Ignatius Eckert House is historic house in Hastings, Minnesota, United States.  It was built in Nininger, Minnesota, in the early 1850s and moved to Hastings in 1857 by then-owner Thomas Reed.  The house is listed on the National Register of Historic Places for its local significance in architecture as an exemplary specimen of an Italian Villa-style house with a cupola.  It is an example of the "Country Homes" style of Andrew Jackson Downing, a pioneer in American landscape architecture. The original owner, Reverend G. W. T. Wright, was a minister at the nearby Hastings Methodist Episcopal Church. Ignatius Eckert, a retired farmer, bought the home around 1909.

See also
 National Register of Historic Places listings in Dakota County, Minnesota

References

1857 establishments in Minnesota Territory
Buildings and structures in Hastings, Minnesota
Houses completed in 1857
Houses in Dakota County, Minnesota
Houses on the National Register of Historic Places in Minnesota
Italianate architecture in Minnesota
National Register of Historic Places in Dakota County, Minnesota
Relocated buildings and structures in Minnesota